The Parable of the Wedding Feast is one of the parables of Jesus and appears in the New Testament in Luke 14:7–14. It directly precedes the Parable of the Great Banquet in Luke 14:15–24. In the Gospel of Matthew, the parallel passage to the Gospel of Luke's Parable of the Great Banquet is also set as a wedding feast (Matthew 22:1–14).

In New Testament times, a wedding was a very sacred and joyous thing. Some even lasted up to or more than a week. When Jesus told this parable, many people were able to understand the picture he was trying to create because he used a Jewish wedding – specifically, a Seudat Nissuin – as the setting of the story.

Luke 14:11 says "Every one that exalteth himself shall be humbled; but he that humbleth himself shall be exalted"; this saying is also found in Luke 18:14 and Matthew 23:12. It is similar to Matthew 18:4.

Narrative

Commentary
The German theologian Friedrich Justus Knecht ( 1921) gives the typical Catholic interpretation of this parable:

Roger Baxter in his Meditations, reflects on this passage, writing:

See also
 Life of Jesus in the New Testament
 Luke 14
 Ministry of Jesus
 Parable of the Faithful Servant
 Parable of the great banquet
 Parable of the Ten Virgins

References

External link

Gospel of Luke
Wedding Feast
Metaphors referring to food and drink